Haxhi Selim Muça was an Albanian Muslim cleric who served as the Grand Mufti of Albania from 2004 to 2014. He was born on 1 February 1936 and died on 18 September 2016 in Tirana, Albania, aged 80 years old. He was also the head of the Sunni Muslim Community of Albania. His predecessor was Shaikh Hafiz Sabri Koçi. His successor is Skënder Bruçaj.

References 

Living people
Albanian imams
Albanian Sunni Muslims
Grand Muftis of Albania
1936 births